Gilze-Rijen Air Base is a military airbase in the south of Netherlands. It is located between the cities of Breda and Tilburg, which are both in North Brabant. The airport is mainly, but not exclusively used as a base for Royal Netherlands Air Force helicopters.

History
Gilze-Rijen Air Base is the oldest airfield in the Netherlands, the first aircraft to have landed there being a Blériot in 1910.  The first military aircraft activity dates back to 1913, when a Farman aircraft used the field for military exercises which established it as a military airfield.

In 1940, the airfield came under heavy attack from the German Luftwaffe, who later took control of the base and expanded it for their own use.  While in German hands during the Second World War, the field came under frequent attack from allied forces until the liberation of the south of the Netherlands, after which the Royal Air Force took control of the airfield.

In 1946, the Royal Netherlands Air Force (RNLAF) resumed operations from the airfield, using it as a training base for pilots and air traffic controllers. In 1962, training activity was suspended, and Gilze-Rijen was reduced to a reserve base for bomber aircraft. Training activity was resumed in 1967, mainly using Fokker S-11s and Piper Cubs. For paratrooper training and group droppings the Fokker F27 Friendship was in use. In 1971, the training activity was suspended again when a fighter squadron was moved to the airfield, which also included a significant upgrade of airport facilities. Initially the Northrop NF-5A/B, and later its replacement, the General Dynamics F-16A/B Fighting Falcon, were operated from the base up until 1995.  It has 30 Hardened Aircraft Shelters (HAS).

In 1995, as a part of a large scale reorganisation within the Royal Netherlands Air Force, the fighter aircraft were moved from Gilze-Rijen, and instead the base became the home of Bölkow Bo-105 helicopters. In 1998, AH-64 Apache attack helicopters followed, while the Bo-105 helicopters were slowly being phased out.

In 2009, helicopter operations from Soesterberg Air Base were moved to Gilze-Rijen Air Base, which resulted in CH-47 Chinook and AS 532U2 Cougar Mk 2 helicopters being based at the airfield as well as the Alouette III for VIP transport, making Gilze-Rijen the main operating base for military helicopters in the Netherlands.

Stichting Koninklijke Luchtmacht Historische Vlucht
The Stichting Koninklijke Luchtmacht Historische Vlucht (Royal Air Force Historic Flight Foundation) is also located at Gilze-Rijen air base, owning and operating a collection of mainly historic military aircraft. The current fleet consists of the following aircraft:
 Auster Mk.III
 Beech T-7 Navigator
 Cessna 172P Skyhawk (for training purposes)
 de Havilland 82A Tiger Moth
 de Havilland Canada DHC-2 Beaver
 Fokker S-11 (4x)
 Noorduyn Harvard IIb (6x)
 North American B-25 Mitchell
 Piper Cub (6x)
 Ryan ST-M
 Stinson L-5 Sentinel
 Supermarine Spitfire Mk.IX

Based units
Units based at Gilze-Rijen Air Base.

Royal Netherlands Air Force 
Defence Helicopter Command
No. 298 Squadron – CH-47D/F Chinook
No. 299 Squadron – Helicopter training and standards
No. 300 Squadron – AS532U2 Cougar Mk 2 
No. 301 Squadron – AH-64D Apache
No. 930 Squadron – Maintenance and Logistics
No. 931 Squadron – Base operations and Force Protection

Centre for Man in Aviation

 SERE School - Survival, Evasion, Resistance and Escape training facility
 OGZ - Operational Healthcare

See also
The Netherlands in World War II

References

External links

 Luchtmacht.nl - Vliegbasis Gilze-Rijen, official website
Royal Netherlands Air Force Historical Flight Foundation
Airliners.net - Photos taken at Gilze-Rijen Air Base

Royal Netherlands Air Force bases
Airports in North Brabant
Gilze en Rijen